Shadow Cabinet of Italy may refer to:

Shadow Cabinet of Italy (1989), launched by Alessandro Natta after the 1987 Italian general election
Shadow Cabinet of Italy (2008), announced by Walter Veltroni after the 2008 Italian general election

See also
Shadow Cabinet (disambiguation)